Keithellakpam is a Meetei Manipuri surname or family name which has Indian origin. .

People of this family mainly inhabit in Manipur, India.

Their mythical progenitor was Thamanglang.

References

External links
 Surnames Similar to Keithellakpam
 Surnames similar to Keithellakpam

Meitei surnames
Pages with unreviewed translations